Henry de Sully (died 11 September 1199, Bourges), was a 12th-century French cardinal. As a member of the Cistercian Order, he was named Archbishop of Bourges before becoming being named Cardinal by Pope Urban III in 1186.

Biography
Henry, born at Suliac, Berry, France, was a younger son of Eudes Archambaud, lord of Sully-sur-Loire, and Matilda of Baugency. Henry had two brothers—father's successor, Gilles III of Sully and Eudes of Sully, who would become Bishop of Paris. Henry entered the Cistercian Order and became abbot of Notre-Dame de Saint-Lieu. In 1183, Henry was elected  patriarch and Archbishop of Bourges. Urban III named Henry a cardinal in 1186, at the consistory of Pentecost Saturday. Henry was legate in Aquitaine. He did participate in any papal elections.

In 1199, Henry served as mediator of a dispute between Guy II, Count of Auvergne and his brother Robert of Auvergne, Bishop of Clermont, that resulted in a state of civil war in Auvergne. The mediation failed and Guy was excommunicated. Following Henry's death, Henry’s brother Eudes, Bishop of Paris, was called upon to nominate a successor, and finding consensus impossible among the factions, he prayed for divine guidance and drew lots, selecting (future Saint) William of Donjeon, who was duly elected.

Alain de Lille would dedicate his Liber poenitenitalis to Henry de Sully.

See also
Cardinals created by Urban III

References

House of Sully
12th-century French cardinals
Archbishops of Bourges
12th-century Roman Catholic archbishops in France
1199 deaths

Year of birth unknown